Imperium Galactum is a 1984 video game designed by Paul Murray and published by Strategic Simulations.

Gameplay

Imperium Galactum is a game in which the player must develop the greatest population base in the star cluster. This goal can be achieved by overseeing the cultivation of land, the extraction of raw materials, the industrial production and transportation of all products, monitoring population numbers, mines and factories, exploring other planetary systems, negotiating with other states and independent planets, and of course waging wars.

The game requires the player to constantly plan for the future. For example, one point of agricultural potential requires the employment of half a point of population and allows for four points of food. Excess food can be transported to planets that have a food shortage, but a sufficiently large fleet of freighters (one for each food point) is required to do so. Similar accounts are kept for the extraction of raw materials in mines and for industrial production. The computer does this automatically, but the player should appropriately balance food, raw materials, manpower, and transportation resources for maximum production. The production is symbolized in points, which are then consumed for certain products. These can be new mines, factories, defense bases, freighters (transporting goods), transporters (transporting people: population or army) and war units. It is also possible to increase the technological level, food potential and create armies. Combat units are a special case here, because the player can design them himself by setting the size of seven different parameters within a given range. It is allowed to have eight different types of units at the same time.

All this only gives the potential to achieve the goal of expanding the empire. The means, on the other hand, are military and trade expeditions, negotiations and, of course, wars. Here, too, there is a wealth of variants: the player can lead an open fight or blockade planets, or hire pirates (in order to cut off the transport of people and products). Enemy or independent planets can be conquered or pacified. In the former case, however, the player can expect guerrilla warfare to destroy agriculture and industry.

Reception
Stewart MacKames reviewed the game for Computer Gaming World, and stated that "it must be concluded that Imperium Galactum is a game which due to randomization factors, optional alternate cluster make-ups, a long list of features, challenging levels of solitaire play, and machiavellian multiplayer dynamics, will continue to be enjoyed for a very long time."

Reviews
Computer Gaming World - Nov, 1992

References

External links
Review in Commodore Microcomputers
Review in InCider
Review in MicroTimes
Review in Atari Magazin (German)
Review in Pelit (Finnish)
Review in Moje Atari (Polish)
Article in Tilt (French)

1984 video games
4X video games
Apple II games
Atari 8-bit family games
Commodore 64 games
Strategic Simulations games
Turn-based strategy video games
Video games developed in the United States
Video games set in outer space